Among those who were born in the London Borough of Bromley, or have dwelt within the borders of the modern borough are (alphabetical order):

 David Bowie (1947–2016), musician, moved to Bromley with his family in 1953
 Malcolm Campbell (1885–1948), Grand Prix racing driver, born in Chislehurst
 Nicholas Cleobury (born 1950), conductor
 Stephen Cleobury (1948–2019), organist and conductor
 Richmal Crompton (1890–1969), author, the Just William stories for children; lived at The Glebe in Oakley Road, Bromley Common
 Charles Darwin (1809–1882), naturalist, known for his theory of evolution, lived in Downe, Bromley
 Eugénie de Montijo (1826–1920), the last Empress of France, lived in exile with her husband Napoleon III at Camden Place in Chislehurst from 1870 until 1885
 Jack Dee (born 1961), stand-up comedian
 Florence Farr (1860–1917), actress and composer, born in Bickley
 Langley Kirkwood (born 1973), actor and athlete
 Nish Kumar (born 1985), comedian, grew up in Bromley and Croydon
 Hanif Kureishi (born 1954), playwright, born in Bromley
 Pixie Lott (born 1991), singer
 Bob Monkhouse (1928–2003), entertainer, born in Beckenham
 Charles Langbridge Morgan (1894–1958), playwright, born at a house in Rodway Road in Bromley
 Napoleon III (1808–1873), last Emperor of France, lived and died in exile at Camden Place in Chislehurst
 William Pitt the Elder, Earl of Chatham (1708–1778), statesman, lived and died at Hayes Place, a former house in Hayes
 William Pitt the Younger (1759–1806), statesman and Prime Minister, born in his father's house in Hayes
 Dorothy Richardson (1873–1957), novelist, lived and died in Beckenham
 Pete Sears (born 1948), musician, producer, composer, environmental and human rights activist, Hayes, Bromley.
 Matt Terry (born 1993), singer, winner of the thirteenth season of The X Factor
 H. G. Wells (1866–1946), author, The War of the Worlds, born in Atlas House, 47 High Street, Bromley
 William Hyde Wollaston (1766–1828), chemist, discovered the elements rhodium and palladium; lived and died in Chislehurst

References

Bromley
People from the London Borough of Bromley